The term King family may refer to

King family (Emmerdale), characters from the Emmerdale TV-series
The King Family Show, a U.S. television show
King Family (band), a German band
a king's family, see royal family
a family with surname King, see King (surname)